Basedowia is a genus of beetles belonging to the family Curculionidae. It's only species is Basedowia basicollis.

The species of this genus are found in Australia.

References

Curculionidae